Károly Korbel (born 5 August 1971) is a Hungarian judoka. He competed in the men's middleweight event at the 1992 Summer Olympics.

References

External links
 

1971 births
Living people
Hungarian male judoka
Olympic judoka of Hungary
Judoka at the 1992 Summer Olympics
Martial artists from Budapest